Lapthe Chau Flora (born Vietnamese: Châu Lập Thể) is a major general in the United States Army who is a special assistant to the director of the Army National Guard. He most recently served as commander of Combined Joint Task Force – Horn of Africa. Flora is the former commander of the Bowling Green-based 91st Troop Command, Virginia National Guard. He also served as the Assistant Adjutant General of the Virginia National Guard in Sandston, Virginia. Concurrently, he served as a deputy commander of United States Army Africa, as well as Army Reserve Component Integration Advisor, United States Army Africa.

Early life
Flora is the son of ethnic Chinese parents, born in South Vietnam in 1962. His father, a South Vietnamese Merchant Marine, was killed during the Vietnam War, when Flora was 2 years old. His mother was left a widow with six children. When he was 11 years old he worked in a factory to help his family and himself.

In 1980, five years after the end of the Vietnam War, Flora fled the city of Saigon, now renamed Ho Chi Minh City, to escape the indoctrination of communist principles initiated by the Hanoi government of Vietnam. He and several siblings lived in the jungle, surviving on snakes, rats, porcupines and vegetation. Flora escaped by boat with other refugees by sailing in the South China Sea. Their ship was later rescued and they were all taken to an Indonesian refugee camp. After a year at the camp, he was allowed to immigrate to the United States, where he was adopted by John and Audrey Flora.

In 1983, Flora graduated from Cave Spring High School in Roanoke, Virginia. He earned a degree in biological sciences from the Virginia Military Institute.

Assignments
In 1988, Flora started his military career in the Virginia National Guard after graduating from the Virginia Military Institute and has since served in every staff position within 1st Battalion, 116th Infantry Regiment, 116th Infantry Brigade Combat Team, including as commander of that battalion.

Flora served as the 116th IBCT executive officer, 29th Infantry Division's director of operations and most recently as the Joint Force Headquarters – Virginia director of strategic plans. He has successfully completed three overseas deployments to Bosnia, Kosovo and Afghanistan. He has also participated in several security cooperation missions with the Republic of Tajikistan as part of the Department of Defense's State Partnership Program.

In May 2015, Flora assumed command of the Bowling Green-based 91st Troop Command, Virginia National Guard at the Army Aviation Support Facility in Sandston, Virginia. On 16 May 2016, he assumed duties as Assistant Adjutant General, with subsequent promotion to brigadier general.

In June 2019, the Senate Armed Services Committee nominated Flora for promotion to major general. In June 2020, he assumed command of Combined Joint Task Force – Horn of Africa.

Civilian career
Flora is Director of Quality Assurance, Night Vision & Communications Solutions (NVCS) with Exelis Inc. in Roanoke, Va., and holds six patent awards related to the AN/PVS-14 and AN/AVS-9 night goggles.

Family
Flora is married to Thuy and they have a daughter named Christine, an AEMT. His adopted father John Flora graduated from Virginia Military Institute in 1937, was a retired realtor, had been a battalion staff officer with the 116th Infantry Regiment when it landed on Omaha Beach on D-Day.

References

External links

The Changing of the Guard
Exelis recognizes Excellence in Action Award winners

1962 births
Living people
Hoa people
People from Virginia
People from Roanoke, Virginia
National Guard (United States) generals
Virginia Military Institute alumni
United States Army personnel of the War in Afghanistan (2001–2021)
Vietnamese emigrants to the United States
Vietnamese refugees
Virginia National Guard personnel
United States Army generals